Throw Down (Judo Dragon and the Tiger List) is a 2004 Hong Kong martial arts film directed by Johnnie To and starring Louis Koo, Aaron Kwok, Cherrie Ying, and Tony Leung Ka-fai. To dedicated the film to the late Japanese filmmaker Akira Kurosawa and, in making it, had drawn upon elements of Kurosawa's debut feature, Sanshiro Sugata. Throw Down had its premiere at the 61st Venice International Film Festival.

Plot
Karaoke manager and band leader Sze-to Bo is a judo expert and former champion who gave up judo a few years ago for unknown reasons, becoming depressed and an alcoholic. Current judo champion Tony, a competitive fighter, admires Bo and challenges him to a duel. Bo's longtime rival, Lee Ah-kong, also arrives to challenge Bo for an old unfinished competition.

Mona is a woman from Taiwan who dreams of becoming a singer, but was nearly forced into prostitution by her evil manager; she seeks refuge in Bo's karaoke. She joins Bo in finding his mentor, Cheng, an old, frail man with a dementia-ridden son, Ching. Cheng asks his disciple to help him to restore the reputation of his dojo, which have become a depressing ruins.

Bo eventually can no longer keep his secret and reveals the true reason he gave up judo: he had developed an incurable retinal disease and his vision is gradually declining; he only has one tenth of his vision left. When Master Cheng dies for his ideals battling on the judo stage, Bo's fighting spirit reignites. Bo is determined to defeat all his opponents before seeing the last line of light.

Cast
Louis Koo as Sze-to Bo
Aaron Kwok as Tony
Cherrie Ying as Mona
Tony Leung Ka-fai as Lee Kong
Eddie Cheung Siu-fai as Boss Savage
Lo Hoi-pang as Cheng
Calvin Choi as Jing
Jordan Chan as Mona's agent
Jack Kao as Mona's father
Albert Au
Yeung Fan
Wing Chung

Release 
Throw Down was released in Hong Kong on 8 July 2004 and in the U.S. on 22 July 2004. On Metacritic, it receives 53/100 Metascore from four critics (The New York Times, Variety, Village Voice and TV Guide).

Home media
Throw Down was released on both DVD and VCD in Hong Kong on September 3, 2004. In the United States, the film was released on DVD by Tai Seng on July 26, 2005. The film was later released on Blu-ray in Hong Kong by Kam & Ronson Enterprises on August 9, 2011.

On May 18, 2020, British home media company Eureka Entertainment released Throw Down on Blu-ray for its Masters of Cinema collection; this release features a new 4K resolution master of the film and a new audio commentary from Frank Djeng. The film will later be released on Blu-ray by the Criterion Collection in North America on September 21, 2021, and will feature new interviews with screenwriter Yau Nai-hoi, composer Peter Kam, and film scholars David Bordwell and Caroline Guo, along with an essay by critic Sean Gilman.

References

External links

hkcinemagic entry
Throw Down: Down but Not Out an essay by Sean Gilman at the Criterion Collection

2004 films
2004 martial arts films
2000s Cantonese-language films
China Star Entertainment Group films
Films directed by Johnnie To
Films set in Hong Kong
Films shot in Hong Kong
Films with screenplays by Yau Nai-hoi
Hong Kong martial arts films
Milkyway Image films
2000s Hong Kong films
Judo films